John Hron (25 January 1981 – 17 August 1995) was a Swedish 14-year-old boy who was tortured to death and drowned by four young neo-Nazis. The month before his death, Hron had won a bronze medal in the national canoeing youth championships.

Murder
Hron had been camping with a friend by the small lake Ingetorpssjön near his hometown Kode in Kungälv Municipality on the night of his murder. Four young men (15-year-old Mikael Fjällholm and 18-year-old Daniel Hansson, plus a 17-year-old and another 18-year-old) appeared, who all had strong ties to the neo-Nazi skinhead subculture and especially the militant Nazi network Vitt Ariskt Motstånd. Hron knew the youngest, Mikael Fjällholm, from school. Mikael, who had been a bully at the school both he and Hron attended, said in his testimony, "I must have scared every last one in that school." Hron, who was known for speaking his mind, had also come in conflict with Mikael and the neo-Nazi gang earlier, and they had threatened to kill him.

On the evening of 17 August 1995, while Hron was camping with his friend Christian at a cliff at lake Ingetorpssjön, the group of neo-Nazis walked up to their campsite, dressed in nazi clothing and playing loud White Power music from a stereo. First, Daniel Hansson threw a can of beer in Hron's face and told him to say that he "loves Nazism", punching him several times in the face, while the others laughed. Hron, being known for standing up against racism, refused to say this and was again beaten brutally for it.

The four began kicking him in the head, hitting him, throwing heavy cans of beer in his face, and taunting him verbally. They would intersperse their beatings with suddenly acting friendly, offering him beers, and apologizing, just to continue beating him again, in what was described as a sadistic "cat-and-mouse"-like torture that went on for hours. They jump-kicked him, kicked him in the back of his head, struck his neck with a flaming piece of wood and burnt him, stomped on his stomach, destroyed his belongings and set fire to the tent he had shared with Christian. Hron and Christian begged several times for the neo-Nazis to let them go home, but this simply angered the attackers who continued hitting Hron until he could no longer stand. Hron was eventually pushed into the lake, still alive, Daniel Hansson "joked" as he did this by saying "now he shall go for a swim" or "now he shall take a dive". Hron tried to swim away and two of the four attackers walked around to the other side of the lake to catch him if he were to swim across. Around this time the murderers also shouted to Hron to swim back, threatening to kill Christian if he did not, and Hron decided to swim back to save his friend's life. Christian was forced to shout to Hron "come back or they will kill me".

The torture continued as two of the most active attackers, Daniel and Mikael, got John up from the lake, and after knocking him down again they placed his body in a position so that they could continue kicking and stomping him in the head for several minutes with their boots. They later said about this part: "It felt so good that we couldn't stop". It was made clear in the investigation that they had kicked and stomped on Hron's face and head with steel-toe boots for about seven minutes without pause. After Hron became unconscious, they rolled his fractured body into the water again. He sunk to the bottom and drowned. In police interviews one of the killers stated they heard "a whistling of gurgling" sound from Hron at this point, although medics said that even if he had not been dumped in the lake it is most unlikely he would have survived the damages to his body and head from the beating.

Christian hitched a ride home and alerted the authorities. The two murderers still on the scene rolled a cigarette as they watched Hron's body sink to the bottom of the lake, later jokingly bragging about it to the other two attackers.

Aftermath, public outcry and prosecution
In court, the 18-year-old boy who was the main person behind the abuse, Daniel Hansson, was sentenced to eight years in prison for murder. He was released on 1 January 2001. Mikael Fjällholm, the 15-year-old, was sentenced to prison (which in Sweden is a rare thing to happen to a convicted teenager). The two others, John Billing and one more known only as BM were sentenced to ten and four months in prison for assault and not alerting authorities to the ongoing assault and murder, respectively.

The case received nationwide attention within Sweden. The public was shocked by the news of such violence and a wave of huge anti-racist manifestations took place to honour Hron's memory. In 1996, Hron posthumously received the inaugural Stig Dagerman Prize for free speech and world peace.

Hron's grave has since been desecrated several times by neo-Nazis.
Murderer Daniel Hansson had previously stabbed a man in an earlier crime as a juvenile offender and was a teenage alcoholic, and at least two of the young murderers were suspected of having severe untreated mental instability and violent behaviour in their childhoods. Another one of the gang was part of a plot to violently attack a sports event. All of them were active neo-Nazis, some of them involved in the violent organization Vitt Ariskt Motstånd (VAM), which translates to "White Aryan Resistance." Racist flyers and propaganda were found in their homes. During the murder they wore t-shirts with Adolf Hitler and other Nazi prints on and bomber jackets. In prison one of them was part in forming the criminal prison gang "Ariska Brödraskapet" (a Swedish version of the "Aryan Brotherhood" but no ties or connections to the US gang has been made officially except inspiration). Mikael Fjällholm was later stabbed in the eye with a screwdriver during his prison sentence by another neo-Nazi, damaging him for life. Daniel Hansson was sentenced after his release for more crimes, including abusing and beating his then-girlfriend.

References

External links 
Nizkor.org memorial
regeringen.se Speech by Prime Minister Göran Persson at the Memorial Service for the Victims of the Holocaust, Stockholm Synagogue, 27 January 2004
 Nizkor.org Trial
 Nizkor.org Appeal

Murdered Swedish children
1995 deaths
1981 births
Hate crimes
Swedish male canoeists
Swedish people of Czech descent
People murdered in Sweden
People from Kungälv Municipality
Deaths by drowning
1995 in Sweden
1995 murders in Sweden 
Sportspeople from Västra Götaland County
Incidents of violence against boys
Neo-Nazism in Sweden